Odin is an American heavy metal band perhaps best known for the appearance in the film The Decline of Western Civilization Part II: The Metal Years.

Odin was a band from Los Angeles that formed in 1983.  Odin guitarist Jeff Duncan went on to play in the Los Angeles metal band Armored Saint after Odin broke up.

Odin lead singer Randy O went on to become a teamster trucker for the film industry.

References

External links

Musical groups established in 1983
Heavy metal musical groups from California
Musical groups from Los Angeles
1983 establishments in California
Glam metal musical groups from California
Hard rock musical groups from California